Arkansas Highway 282 is a north–south state highway in Crawford County. The route parallels Interstate 49 for almost its entire length.

Route description
AR 282 begins at US 64 east of Van Buren. The route crosses I-40/I-49/US 71 (no interchange) east of Van Buren before turning north towards Rudy. AR 282 concurs with AR 348 in Rudy before turning east to cross I-49 again. The route continues east to Dean's Market, running north briefly with US 71/AR 162/AR 348. The route continues due north alone, crossing and then crossing back over I-49. AR 282 meets US 71 again in Mountainburg before again crossing I-49 to Chester. In Chester, AR 282 terminates at Brown Street.

Major intersections

|-
| align=center colspan=5|  concurrency, 
|-

|-
| align=center colspan=5| Gap in route
|-

Spur route

The route connects AR 282 over Interstate 49 to the local Arkansas State Highway and Transportation Department shop.

Major junctions

See also
 
 
 List of state highways in Arkansas

References

External links

282
Transportation in Crawford County, Arkansas
Fort Smith metropolitan area